Formula Super Vee was an open-wheel racing series that took place in Europe and the United States from 1970 to 1990. The formula was created as an extension of Formula Vee, a racing class that was introduced in 1959. Formula Super Vee in Europe was similar to F3 or Formula Renault  today, a stepping stone to F1. In the United States, Formula Super Vee, often referred to as Super Vee, was a natural progression to Indy Car and Can-Am. On both sides of the Atlantic the series also was a platform for the promotion of VW products, similar to how Formula Renault promotes Renault products today.

Initially it was seen as a simple step up from Formula Vee, using the same type 3 air-cooled VW engines, but in 1600cc. However it soon transformed to using the very different and more powerful fuel injected water-cooled engines from the VW Golf/Rabbit.

History
To assist the launch of the new formula Volkswagen of America's, Jo Hopen, commissioned Gene Beach, an established constructor of Formula Vee cars, to design and build the first Super Vee and put this car on display at the Daytona 24 hour race. Beach was one of the first three constructors of Formula Vees, along with Autodynamics and Formcar. It is therefore appropriate that a Super Vee designed and built by Ray Caldwell’s Autodynamics concern soon joined the Beach Super Vee. This second Super Vee (the Caldwell D-10) was put on display at the New York Auto Show. Other manufacturers soon followed suit, with Formula Vee constructors such as Zink Cars joined by more mainstream firms such as Lola. John Zeitler also built his first cars around the same time as Beach and Caldwell. As a matter of fact, John Zeitler won the very first Super Vee race at Lime Rock Park in 1970. This race was run with the Formula Ford class.

Initially the series allowed 1600cc air-cooled engines of either type 3 (as used in the VW 1500 and 1600) or type 4 (as used in the VW 411, 412 and the VW-Porsche 914/4 sports car), however at a late stage VW had a change of heart and decided that the type 4 engines would be a better option. The type 4 engine is without doubt a better engine. However, this motor was never produced in a 1600cc version so VW decided to produce a "special" 1600cc version through their industrial engines division (the 127V unit), with smaller pistons and barrels, which reduced the capacity to 1600cc.

As with any formula, Formula Super Vee progressed through a number of changes during its life. Initially, for example, the cars ran without wings and used drum brakes at the rear. Later the regulations allowed the use of 8-inch rear wheels, rear disc brakes and 34 mm exhaust valves (1973) and then rear wings (1975). Since slick tyres had yet to be introduced into racing, the cars ran with treaded racing tyres, such as the Firestone "No-DOT", but later moved onto slicks.

The original regulations specified a non-Hewland gearbox and cars ran with fixed ratio VW boxes. In Europe a company called Metso began building Hewland-like boxes which provided the ability to change ratios to suit each circuit and exploited the wording of the regulations, which had simply banned Hewland boxes rather than explicitly specifying the fixed ratio VW box. Once the cars started to use Metso boxes the regulations were changed and Hewland Gearboxes were also allowed. This change, combined with start money being offered by Hewland to drivers using its products, effectively put Metso out of business, although the company did build boxes for other formula cars such as Formula Fords.

Much later, engine regulations were also opened up, allowing fuel injected water-cooled engines from the Volkswagen Golf (or Rabbit as the Mk1 was known in North America). The water-cooled engines inevitably replaced the air-cooled, which were rendered uncompetitive, and many air-cooled cars were converted to accept the water-cooled engine. Some constructors, such as Lola, offered "conversion kits" which allowed the fitment of the Golf/Rabbit engine to earlier air-cooled chassis. The SCCA in the USA did allow 1700cc air-cooled engines towards the end of the air-cooled period, to remain competitive while the water-cooled cars joined the grid.

Ultimately the most developed version of Super Vee was to be found in the USA, since they continued with a Super Vee series years after the formula had died away elsewhere. Indeed, by late 70s Super Vee in the USA had become the feeder formula for Indy cars, referred to as the "Mini-Indy" series.  This series was run in conjunction with the much older VW-Bosch "Gold Cup" for Super V.  This series lasted until 1990 and, unlike the oval track USAC Mini Indy Series, was a road racing series.  Each series crowned its own champion each year. In the late 70s the Ron Tauranac designed the Ralt RT1 and RT5, based on his Formula 3 designs, had a virtual monopoly in the USA series.

The original Formula Super Vee series specifications
 Engine: Type 3 1600cc (actually a stroke of 69 mm and a bore of 85.5 mm for a displacement of 1582cc). Dry sump not allowed.
 Cooling: air, with external oil coolers and oil filters.
 Carburetion: free, however most used Weber 48 IDA or Solex 40P11 dual downdraft. Some use of Weber IDF and DCNF. (Note: two dual down draft carbs allowed, any manufacturer with dual port VW or aftermarket intake manifolds).
 Transmission: stock VW from the 1969 Square back/fastback series. However, gear ratios were open and almost immediately Webster and Hewland gear sets were adopted for the VW transaxle.
 Ignition: coil and distributor.
 Clutch: VW stock, with Hydraulic linkage.
 Brakes: Girling hydraulic with VW discs front, VW Drums in the rear.
 Wheels: 6" X 13" front and rear. Magnesium allowed.
 Tires: 5:00/8:30 X 13 front, Treaded (no slicks) 5:50/9/20 X 13 rear, Treaded (no slicks)
 Steering: Rack and Pinion
 Suspension: free, front and rear
 Shocks: free, front and rear
 Sway bars: free, front and rear
 Rear uprights: free (and usually proprietary by car manufacturer)
 Curb Weight: Dry, without driver, 825 lbs minimum.
 Wheelbase: free (most manufacturers were between 88" and 94")
 Track, Front/Rear: Up to 92"
 Fuel Tank Capacity: Free, but most manufacturers located the tank under and behind the driver but in front of the firewall, which pretty much limited the capacity to 6.0 gallons.
 Construction: tubular space frame, flat bottom, no wings or tabs to induce downforce.
 Body: any material, but full coverage (including engine compartment) required.

Champions

SCCA Super Vee Gold Cup (professional) (USA)

USAC Mini-Indy (professional) (USA)

1Bagley and Johnson tied in the points and were declared co-champions.

Formel Super Vau GTX (Germany)/German Formula Super Vee Championship

Formula Super Vau Gold Pokal (Europe)/European Formula Super Vee Championship

References

External links
 FSV Forum and classifieds 
 Formula Super Vee website and registry (new site)

Formula Super Vee|Super Vee
Super Vee
One-make series